Gonodonta pyrgo is a species of fruit-piercing moth in the family Erebidae first described by Pieter Cramer in 1777. It is found in North America.

The MONA or Hodges number for Gonodonta pyrgo is 8539.

References

Further reading

External links

 

Calpinae
Articles created by Qbugbot
Moths described in 1777